The NWA Television Championship is a title controlled by, and defended in NWA Southern All-Star Wrestling.
 
Southern All-star Wrestling later known as Showtime All-star Wrestling created the SAW Television Championship in 2007 then later changed its name to the SAW International Heavyweight Championship in June 2008. On March 15, 2013, the title was changed once again to the NWA Television Championship after SAW joined the NWA (National Wrestling Alliance) under the all new NWA SAW Branding.

Title history

List of Combined Reigns

By Wrestler

External links
NWA-SAW Official Website

Television wrestling championships
Regional professional wrestling championships